Kitani Mohabbat Hai (How Much I Love You) is an Indian soap opera which aired on Imagine TV from 19 January 2009 to 25 September 2009. Kitani Mohabbat Hai 2 started airing on 1 November 2010. Season 2 is not a continuation; it stars the same leads in a different story.

Season 1 was launched at Krishna Cottage in Mumbai days before the premiere. In 2019, This show was re-aired on Dangal TV

Plot
This tale of pure love begins as Arjun, the son of business tycoon DK Punj is introduced in jail. He refuses to accept release on bail. Ganga Rai, a young lawyer is determined to find his story out. Arjun emotionally reveals the past.

2 years back
Arjun meets and falls in love with Aarohi Sharma, a simple aspiring singer from Shimla. Her father Hariprasad runs a Gurukul, her widowed sister-in-law Purvi, and her sisters are Antara and Sur. As Hariprasad retires, Aarohi is assigned as Arjun's associate to support her family. Materialistic and arrogant, Arjun doesn't treat her well, as being the son of a separated couple, he hates his mother and so all women. Aarohi continues to stand up to him, which attracts Arjun and softens him towards her, and they gradually develop feelings for each other.

Meanwhile, their ties are strengthened as Salil Mittal, Arjun's best friend and the son of D K Punj's business partner, whose family live with the Punjs, falls in love with Purvi and marries her against his family's wishes.

During this, Arjun finds out that Aarohi's mentor and mother figure is his mother, Savita, who abandoned him in childhood. He feels betrayed by Aarohi as he believes that she is plotting with his mother to break his heart. As a result, he breaks off their alliance, only to find out it was his father's fault that his parents separated. During the time that he is unaware of the truth, he constantly taunts and insults Aarohi and makes he feel worthless. After Savita tells Arjun the truth, he wishes to reconcile with Aarohi, but they meet in an accident.

Post recovery, Aarohi goes to Mumbai to pursue her music career. Arjun also, leaves his wealth and his family behind to support Aarohi in her new journey. He protects her in Mumbai and clears her path whereas Aarohi feels like he is there to ruin her opportunities. Aarohi soon meets Karan. Her family supports her relationship with Karan, but she still loves Arjun. After an incident in which Arjun rescues Aarohi from a building which caught fire, the two reconcile and are finally happy again. However, this doesn’t last long.

Arjun’s father, D K Punj, scared of having another middle-class "greedy" woman in a wealthy family, reveals to Aarohi that Arjun is adopted and blackmails her with this long-kept secret to leave Arjun. Aarohi thus accepts Karan's proposal to marry her to protect Arjun from the “truth.” When Arjun finds this out, he kidnaps Aarohi from her wedding venue, and her family rushes to rescue her. Her father falls from the terrace and dies in the scuffle, and Arjun is blamed and arrested for his murder.

As Arjun finishes his narration, the show leaps to the present, and Ganga Rai begins to try proving him innocent to prevent his hanging. She finds Aarohi, who is now a famous singer who goes by “Akshita Hariprasad”, and asks her to help Arjun, but she refuses. Meanwhile, Salil's mother, Padmalakshmi Mittal, has footage of that night and accidentally misplaces it in some packages. Aarohi receives the CD, which proves Arjun's innocence and rushes to save Arjun, and is successful, but unfortunately does not meet him.

Both of them leave for Shimla, where they first met, and wish to retire there from a life of chaos. As Aarohi runs towards the train, Arjun reaches his hand out to her, like the first time they met, and they unite. The last scene shows them marrying happily ever after.

Cast

Main
 Karan Kundrra as Arjun Punj
 Kritika Kamra as Aarohi Sharma

Recurring
 Hiten Tejwani as Karan Singh
 Rakshanda Khan as Ganga Rai
 Satyajit Sharma as Darshan Kumar "DK" Punj
 Papiya Sengupta/Neena Gupta as Savita Punj
 Veerendra Saxena as Hari Prasad Sharma
 Shresth Kumar as Salil Mittal
 Pooja Gor as Purvi Sharma / Purvi Mittal
 Akshita Kapoor as Antara Sharma 
 Sonam Mann as Sur Sharma
 Nitin Chatterjee as Jayesh Mehta
 Sheeba Chadha as Padmalakshmi Mittal
 Mihika Verma as Natasha Mittal
 Sudha Shivpuri as Bua
 Mrinal Dutt as Aman Mittal 
 Ayaz Ahmed as Abhay
 Irfan Razaa Khan as Vikas Gupta 
 Priya Bathija as Mallika

Sequel
A new season was started soon after titled Kitani Mohabbat Hai 2.

References

External links

 Kitani Mohabbat Hai Season 1 on Dangal Play

Balaji Telefilms television series
2009 Indian television series debuts
2009 Indian television series endings
Imagine TV original programming
Indian television soap operas
Colors Rishtey original programming
Dangal TV original programming